The United States Senate Democratic Policy Committee is responsible for the creation of new United States Democratic Party policy proposals, supporting Democratic senators with legislative research, developing reports on legislation and policy, conducting oversight hearings, monitoring roll call votes, differentiating between Democratic and Republican positions, and building party unity.

The committee was established in 1947, by an act signed by President Harry S. Truman, alongside its Republican counterpart. From 1947 to 2000, the Democratic leader was also the policy committee chairman. From 1989 to 1999, there was a co-chairman. Starting in 1999, the co-chairman was dropped and the position of policy committee chairman became a separate position elected by the Senate Democratic Caucus. The floor leader served as committee chair until 1989, when one of the co-chairs remained leader (Mitchell through 1995 and then Daschle until 1999). The committee chairman is a member of the Democratic party leadership of the United States Senate.

List of chairs

113th Congress members

External links
 Official Senate Democratic Policy Committee  Website

Policy Committee Chairman of the United States Senate
Leaders of the United States Senate
Senate Democratic Policy Committee
Lists related to the United States Senate